Mein Leben ('My Life') is a series of biographical documentaries from the French/German TV network Arte. The series, which has been running since 2003, covers artists from all disciplines, including actors, authors, musicians and photographers. Each episode runs approximately 45 minutes.

Episode subjects include
Franziska van Almsick (2003)
Campino (2004)
Paul Auster (2006)
Mads Mikkelson (2006)
Norman Mailer (2007)
Fatih Akın (2007)
Moritz Rinke (2007)
Jim Rocket (2007)
Peter Härtling (2008)
Alexandra Maria Lara and Valentin Plătăreanu (2008)
Nina Hoss (2009)
Carl Djerassi (2009)
Christian Stückl (2010)
Sibylle Bergemann

External links 
Mein Leben at IMDb

German-language television shows